Safety signs are a type of sign designed to warn of hazards, indicate mandatory actions or required use of Personal protective equipment, prohibit actions or objects, identify the location of firefighting or safety equipment, or marking of exit routes.

In addition to being encountered in industrial facilities; safety signs are also found in public places and communities, at electrical pylons and Electrical substations, cliffs, beaches, bodies of water, on motorized equipment, such as lawn mowers, and areas closed for construction or demolition.

History

In the United States

Early signs and ASA Z35.1
One of the earliest attempts to standardize safety signage in the United States was the 
1914 Universal Safety Standards. The signs were fairly simple in nature, consisting of an illuminated board with "DANGER" in white letters on a red field. An arrow was added to draw attention to the danger if it was less obvious. Signs indicating exits, first aid kits consisted of a green board, with white letters. The goal with signs was to inform briefly.
The next major standards to follow were ASA Z35.1 in 1941, which later revised in 1967 and 1968.
The Occupational Safety and Health Administration devised their requirements from ASA Z35.1-1968 in the development of their rules, OSHA §1910.145 for the usage of safety signage

ANSI Z535
In the 1980s, American National Standards Institute formed a committee to update the Z53 and Z35 standards. In 1991, ANSI Z535 was introduced, which was intended to modernize signage through increased use of symbols, the introduction of a new header, 'Warning' and requiring that wording not just state the hazard, but also the possible harm the hazard could inflict and how to avoid the hazard. Until 2013, OSHA regulations technically required usage of signage prescribed in OSHA §1910.145, based on the standard ASA Z35.1-1968. Regulation changes and clarification of the law now allow usage of signs complying with either OSHA §1910.145 or ANSI Z535 designs.

In Europe
Prior to widespread globalization and adoption of standards from the ISO, most countries developed their own standards for safety signage. Text only signs were common prior to introduction of European Council Directive 77/576/EEC on 25 July 1977, which required member states to have policies in place to ensure that "safety signs at all places of work conform to the principles laid down in Annex I", which required color coding and symbols.
In 1992, the European Council Directive 92/58/EEC replaced EEC 77/576/EEC. The new directive included improved information on how to utilize safety signage effectively. Beyond safety signs, EEC Directive 92/58/EEC standardize markings for fire equipment, acoustic signals, verbal and hand signals for vehicle movements.
In 2013, the European Union adopted ISO 7010 to replace the symbols provided previously, adopting them as European Norm (EN) ISO 7010, standardizing symbols among the EU countries. Prior to this, while symbols were provided, symbols were permitted to vary in appearance "provided that they convey the same meaning and that no difference or adaptation obscures the meaning".

In Australia
Australian safety signage started in 1952 as CZ4-1952: Safety signs for the occupational environment. It revised and redesignated as AS1319-1972 in 1972, with further revisions taking place in 1979, 1983 and 1994. In August 2018, AS1319-1994 was reconfirmed as still being valid and not in need of major revisions.

In Japan
Japanese safety signage is notable for its clear visual differences from international norms, such as use of square 'no symbols', vertical formatting of sign text. Safety sign standards are regulated by Japanese Industrial Standards through standards JIS Z9101 (Workplace and public area safety signs) JIS Z 9103 (Safety sign colors) and JIS Z 9104 (Safety signs - General specifications). While design trends have been moving towards international norms of ISO and ANSI standards, differences are still present such as the use of symbols unique to the JIS standards, using colors differently from ISO standards and using a combination of Japanese kanji and English.

In addition to typical safety sign standards, Japan introduced JIS Z 9098 in 2016 specifically addressing emergency management needs: informing people of areas susceptible to natural disasters, evacuation routes and safe shelters from disasters. The standard's more unique aspect is the usage of maps and diagrams to provide more detailed information about the area's hazards, shelters and evacuation routes.

In China
Chinese safety signage is regulated by Standardization Administration of China using GB standards 2893-2008 and 2894-2008, which all safety signs are legally required to comply with. Designs are similar to ISO 3864 and uses older ISO 7010:2003 symbols, while adding several additional symbols covering a wider range of prohibitions and hazards.

Sign design and layout
Modern signage design typically consists of a symbol, warning text and in some countries a header consisting of a signal word.

Headers

North American and some Australian safety signage utilize distinctive headers to draw attention to the risk of harm from a hazard. Headers have guidelines for usage, where conditions must be met to dictate which header must be used for a sign.

The 2007 revisions to ANSI Z353.4 allowed for the 'safety alert symbol' found on 'Danger', Warning' and 'Caution' headers to be replaced with the ISO 7010 "W001 - General warning" symbol to enable compliance with ISO 3864-1 for signs used in international situations or equipment being exported abroad. 
Additional headers designs exist, Z53.1-1968 prescribed a magenta and yellow 'Radiation' header for radiation hazards. Other headers have been created by sign manufacturers for various situations not covered Z53.1 standard, such as "Security Notice", "Biohazard", "Restricted Area".

Symbols

As a means of overcoming language and literacy barriers, symbols depicting the hazards, required action or equipment, prohibited actions or items and safety equipment were introduced to safety signage during the 1990s. Globalization and increased international trade helped push this development, as a means of reducing costs associated with needing signage multiple languages. Increasingly, countries are adopting symbols used by ISO 7010 and UN Globally Harmonized System of Classification and Labelling of Chemicals, that harmonizes symbols internationally to reduce confusion, and bring themselves into compliance with international standards.

Portable signage

For temporary situations such as wet floors, portable signs are used. They are designed to be self supporting and relatively easy to move once the task is complete. The 1914 Universal Safety Standards provided for a portable 'Danger' sign suitable for both hard floors and soft dirt. Portable signs can take a variety of forms, from a traffic cone with stick on letters, plastic a-frame signs, to safety signs mounted on poles with bases that enable movement.

Wet floor signs are also intended to avoid legal liability from injury due failing to warn of an unsafe condition. They are usually yellow. The warning is sometimes enhanced with new technology to provide audible warnings.  Robotic cleaning equipment can use wet floor signs with sonar gadgetry to know when its job is finished.

Effectiveness of safety signs

Since the late 1980s, more emphasis has been put on testing signage for clarity and to eliminate possible misunderstandings. Researchers have examined the impacts of using different signal words, inclusion of borders and color contrast with text and symbols against sign backgrounds.  In 1999, a group of designers were tasked with creating standardized warning labels for personal watercraft. The group devised several versions of the same warning label using different symbols, wording and emphasis of key phrases through use of underlining, bold fonts and capitalizing. The label designs were reviewed by the United States Coast Guard, United States Power Squadron, industry representatives and subjected to ease of comprehension and readability tests. Results of these reviews and tests lead to further revisions of words and redesigning of some symbols. The resulting labels are still applied to personal watercraft nearly 20 years after their initial design.

Placement of signs also affects the effectiveness of signs. A 1993 study tested compliance with a warning against loading the top drawer of a filing cabinet first. The warning was least effective when it was only placed on the shipping box, but most effective when placed as part of a removable cardboard sleeve that physically obstructed the top drawer, interfering with adding files to the drawer.

Sign effectiveness can be reduced from a number of factors, including information overload, where the sheer amount of information is presented in a manner that a reader is unable process it adequately, such as being confronted by a sign consisting of dozens of words with no paragraph breaks, or excessive amounts of unnecessary information. This can be prevented through simplifying warnings down to their key points, with supplementary manuals or training covering the more nuanced and minor information. Overwarning is a related problem, where warnings are overlooked by people due to the sheer number of warnings, such as placing many safety signs together, redundant or obvious warnings. Effectiveness can be reduced through conditions such as poor maintenance, placing a sign too high or low, or in a way that requires excessive effort to read.

Current technical standards

 ISO 3864 - International - Adopted in 2011–2016.
 ISO 7010 - International - Adopted in 2011.
 ISO 7001 - International - Adopted in 2007.
 Regulation (EC) No 1272/2008 - European adoption of GHS - Adopted in 2009.
 Globally Harmonized System of Classification and Labelling of Chemicals (GHS) - Adopted 2005–2017.
 ANSI Z535-2011 - United States - Adopted in 2011.
 EC Directive 92/58 - European Union - Adopted in 1992.
 AS1319-1994 - Australia - Adopted in 1994
 JIS Z 9101 - Japan - Adopted in 2005. - Workplace and public area safety signs.
 JIS Z 9104 - Japan - Adopted 2005 - General safety signs.
 JIS Z 9098 - Japan - Adopted in 2016 - Emergency Management Signs.
 GB 2893-2008 - China -Safety Colours - Adopted in 2008.
 GB 2894-2008 - China - Safety Signs and Guidelines for Use - Adopted in 2008.

Former technical standards

 ANSI Z35.1-1968 - United States - Superseded in 2011 by ANSI Z535-2011
 European Council Directive 92/58/EEC - European Union & Europe - Superseded by EN ISO 7010.
 BS 5499 - Great Britain - Superseded in 2015 by BS EN ISO 7010.
 DIN 4844-2 - German - Superseded in 2013 by DIN EN ISO 7010.
 ISO/R 557:1967 "Symbols, dimensions and layout for safety signs" - Superseded in 1984 by ISO 3864:1984.
 European Council Directive 67/548 - Superseded in 2016 by CLP.
 Council Directive 77/576/EEC - European Union - Superseded by Council Directive 92/58/EEC.
 ISO 20712-1 - International - Merged into ISO 7010 in 2018.

See also
 Hazard Symbol
 Placard
 Exit sign
 Pipe marking
 Floor marking tape
 Barricade tape

Notes

References

External links
 
 

Safety equipment
Communication

Signage